Circle Magazine was published from 1944 to 1948 by  George Leite, initially with poet Bern Porter. Produced at Leite's Berkeley, California, bookstore daliel's (stylized with a lowercase 'd'), it featured poetry, prose, criticism and art from many of those whose creative works and their successors would later come to be called the San Francisco Renaissance. In addition to the magazine, Circle Editions published contemporary authors such as Albert Cossery and Henry Miller (a personal friend of Leite's).

Issue contents and covers 
Number one, 1944

 Henry Miller – Open Letter to Small Magazines
 Philip Lamantia – Two Poems
 Bern Porter – You're No Dope: Let Me Save You
 Jeanne McGahey – Street With People
 Rosalie Moore – Poem In 2 Scenes
 George Elliott – The Red Battery
 George Leite – Toward A Technique Of Rule
 Josephine Miles – Four Poems
 Joseph Van Auker – Pirandello In Chains
 Lawrence Hart (poet) – The Map Of The Country
Number two, 1944

 Henry Miller – To Anaïs Nin Regarding One Of Her Books
 Glen Coffield – Two Poems
 William Everson – Two War Elegies
 R. H. Barlow – Four Poems
 Bern Porter – Letter To Gabene
 W. Edwin Ver Becke – Four Line Prints
 C.F. MacIntyre – Rilke And The Lost God
 Dean Jeffries – Three Poems
 William Carlos Williams – To The Dean
 George Leite – To Henry Miller
 Philip Lamantia – Two Poems
 Shaemus Keilty – Quinquin
Number three, 1944

 Harry Hershkowitz – The Bulbul Birds
 Kenneth Patchen – Four Poems
 W. Edwin Ver Becke – The Father
 Yvan Goll – Histoire De Parmenia L'Havanaise
 Thomas Parkinson – Morning Passage
 George Elliott – Two Poems
 Douglas MacAgy – Palimpsest
 Pvt. Leonard Wolf – Two Poems
 Hamilton Tyler – Mr. Eliot And Mr. Milton
 Jackson Burke – Poem
 Pvt. J.C. Crews – Poem
 M. Wheelan Grote – First Impression Of College
 Lt (jg) Hubert Creekmore – Two Poems
 Marie Wells – Two Poems
 Lawrence Hart (poet) – About Marie Wells
 Robert Lottick – Poem
 Wendel Anderson – Poem
 Kenneth Rexroth – Les Lauriers Sont Coupés
Number four, 1944

 Anaïs Nin – The All-Seeing
 Theodore Schroeder – Where Is Obscenity?
 Arthur Ginzel – Four
 Walter Fowlie – The Two Creators
 George Leite – Low Darkened Shelter
 Henry Miller – Varda: The Master Builder
 Lee Ver Duft – Poems
 Herbert Cahoon – Marley And The Gemini
 Lt. Joseph Stanley Pennell – Two Poems
 Bern Porter – All Over The Place
 James Franklin Lewis – To John Wheelwright
 Forrest Anderson – Sea Poems
 Warren d'Azevedo – Deep Six For Danny
 Lt. Robert L. Dark – Two poems
 Kenneth Rexroth – Les Lauriers Sont Coupés
Number five, 1945

 Weldon Kees – The Purcells
 E.E. Cummings – Five Poems
 Dane Rudhyar – Neptune, Evocator Extraordinary
 Jess Cloud – Three Portraits
 Henri Hell – Max Jacob
 Douglas MacAgy – Clay Spohn's War Machines
 Henry Miller – Preface For The Power Within Us
 Aline Musyl – Four Little Poems
 Albert Clements – Rain
 Alfred Young Fisher – Voltas For Fugues
 George Leite & Bern Porter – Photo-poems
 Frederic Ramsey, Jr. – Artist's Life
 Nicholas Moore – A Poem & A Story
 Marguerite Martin – First Pity
 Paul Radin – Journey Of The Soul
 Max Harris – Two Poems
Number six, 1945

 Lawrence Hart (poet) – Some Elements Of Active Poetry
 Rosalie Moore – Letter To Camp Orford, Poem In Two Scenes, text
 R. H. Barlow – Framed Portent, Table Set For Sea Slime, text
 Marie Wells – Death At Noon, Monody In One, text
 Jeanne McGahey – Road To Chicago, text
 Alfred Morang – Darling Sister And The Pound Of Liver
 Haldeen Brady -Whirl
 Henry Miller – Knud Merrild: A Holiday In Paint
 Robert Barlow – Tepuzteca, Tepehua
 James Laughlin – Poem In 38 Lines
 Thomas Parkinson – John Works On A Figure Of Virginia, Carving It
 Harry Roskolenko – Return, The Expert
 Eugene Gramm – A Gallery Of Americans
 Maude Phelps Hutchins – Soliloquy At Dinner
 Alex Comfort – The Soldiers
 William Pillin – My Reply As A Jew
 Leonora Carrington – Flannel Night Shirt
 Richard O. Moore – Villanelle 1, Villanelle 2
 Kenneth Rexroth – Les Lauriers Sont Coupés
Numbers seven and eight, 1946

 Robert Duncan (poet) – The Years As Catches
 Ian Hugo – Two Block Prints
 Anaïs Nin – Hedja
 Hamilton Tyler – Finnegan Epic
 Bern Porter – Map Of Joyce's Life
 Lindley Williams Hubbell Jacques Vache
 Kenneth Patchen – Sleepers Awake
 Thomas Hughes Ingle – Tattooed Sailor
 Kenneth O. Hanson – Falstaff And The Chinese Poet
 Douglas MacAgy – Without Horizon
 James McCray – Four Paintings
 Yvan Goll – The Magic Circle
 Brewster Ghiselin – Concert In Dorse
 Charlotte Marletto – Oblique Epitome
 A.M. Klein – In Memoriam
 Thomas Parkinson – Letter To A Young Lady
 Howard O'Hagan – The Colony
 Edmund de Coligny – The Poem Of The Two Oscars
 Robert Barlow – Angel Hernandez, Artist
 George Leite & Bern Porter – Two Photo-poems
 Edwin Ver Becke – A Line Drawing And A Story, The Tryst
 Gil Orovitz – Flamenco
 Shaun FitzSimon – Easter Bells
 Roger Pryor Dodge – A Non-esthetic Basis For The Dance
 Alex Austin – Civilization
 Oscar Williams – The Lemmings
 Paul Radin – Three Conversions
 Osmond Beckwith – Fire Sale
 Warren D' Azevedo – Blue Peter
 Darius Milhaud – French Music Between Two Wars
 George Barrows – Creative Photography
 W.S. Graham – Three Poems
 Eithene Wilkins – Two Poems
 Jack Jones – A Story, A Poem
 Samuel Holmes – The Death Of An Innocent
 James Steel Smith – Murder And Complacency
 Georges Henein – There Are No Pointless Jests
 Martin H. Mack – It All Depends On How You Want It
 David Cornel DeJong – Three Poems
 Henry Miller – Three Books Tangent To Circle
Number nine, 1946

 Lawrence Durrell – Eight Aspects Of Melissa
 Gerald Burke – Essay On Children
 Richard O. Moore – A History Primer
 Jim Fitzsimmons – Four Experimental Nudes
 David Stuart – The Inflammable Angel Kezia
 C.F. MacIntyre – The Ars Poetica Of Paul Valery
 William Everson – The Release
 A. Seixas – Ellwood Graham
 George Leite – The Wing: The Mirror
 Alexis Comfort – Taras And The Snowfield
 Walker Winslow – NP Ward
 Hilaire Hiler – Manifesto Of Psychromatic Design
 Harold Norse – Three Poems
 Robert Wosniak – The Man In The Cape
 Robert Stock – Triumphal Arch
 Ericka Braun – Oath Of The Tennis Court
 Max Harris (poet) – Revolutionary Poem
 Mary Fabilli – The Memorable Hospital
 Will Gibson – Poem For Three
 Selwyn Schwartz – Four Poems
 Ernst Kaiser – The Development From Surrealism
 Richard Lyons (writer) – A Note To Kenneth Patchen
 Byron Vazakas – Two Poems
 Henry Miller – Rimbaud Opus (Part Two)
 Harry Roskolenko – PR, The Portable Review
Number ten, 1948

 John Whitney & James Whitney – Audio-Visual Music
 Joseph Stanley Pennell – Logistics
 Mary Fabilli – The Boss
 Giuseppe Ungaretti – Eight Poems
 Antony Borrow – The Great Refusal
 Douglas MacAgy – A Margin Of Chaos
 Charles Howard – The Bride
 Harry Partch – Show-horses In The Concert Ring
 Robert Barlow – The Malinche Of Acacingo
 Alex Comfort – Two Enemies Of Society
 D. Rentis – Forward
 Attile Joseph – Two Poems
 Clarisse Blazek – Poet In Hungary
 George Elliott – Story
 Luis J. Trinkaus – Eight Inches Of Snow
 Kendrick Smithyman – Legends Of The Gunner And His Girl
 Warren D'Azevedo – Shuttle
 Robert Duncan – Toward An African Elegy
 Jody Scott & George Leite- Admission of Fission

References

External links

 Circle History, from Jean Varda's ferryboat's website

1944 establishments in California
1948 disestablishments in California
Poetry magazines published in the United States
Beat Generation
Defunct literary magazines published in the United States
Magazines disestablished in 1948
Magazines established in 1944
Magazines published in the San Francisco Bay Area
Mass media in Berkeley, California